Pterostylis rubiginosa is a species of orchid endemic to northeastern New South Wales. Flowering and non-flowering plants have a rosette of leaves that is withered by the time flowering occurs. Flowering plants have up to seven white flowers with rusty brown stripes, on a wiry flowering stem.

Description
Flowering plants have a similar rosette on side growth but the leaves wither before the flowers open. The dorsal sepal and petals are fused, forming a hood or "galea" over the column. The labellum is not visible above the sinus between the lateral sepals. Flowering has been observed between mid November and early December.

Taxonomy and naming
This greenhood was first formally described in 2016 by David Jones and Lachlan Copeland and given the name Speculantha rubiginosa. The description was published in the Australian Orchid Review from a specimen collected in the Dorrigo National Park. In the same year, the same authorities changed the name to Pterostylis rubiginosa "to allow for the different taxonomic views held at generic level within the subtribe". The specific epithet (rubiginosa) is a Latin word meaning "rusty", referring to the colour of the flowers of this orchid.

This species is similar to others not yet formally published, including P. recta from near Wauchope and P. oresbia from the Barrington Tops and Werrikimbe National Parks.

Distribution and habitat
This greenhood grows in open forest and nearby grassland in a small area of the Dorrigo National Park.,

References

rubiginosa
Endemic orchids of Australia
Orchids of New South Wales
Plants described in 2016